Macaria bicolorata, the bicolored angle, is a moth of the  family Geometridae. It is found in Eastern North America.

The moths are on wing from May to August depending on the location.

The larvae feed on Pinus species.

References

External links
Bugguide

Macariini
Moths described in 1798